Taparita is an extinct language of the Venezuelan Llanos.

References 

Extinct languages of South America
Otomákoan languages